Mechanicsburg is an unincorporated community in Fall Creek Township, Henry County, Indiana.

History
Mechanicsburg was laid out and platted in 1858. A relatively high number of settlers employed as mechanics caused the name to be selected. The post office in Mechanicsburg was discontinued in 1907.

Geography

References

Unincorporated communities in Henry County, Indiana
Unincorporated communities in Indiana